Ragnheiður Sara Sigmundsdóttir (born ) is an Icelandic weightlifter and CrossFit athlete known for her third-place finishes at the 2015 and 2016 CrossFit Games and her first-place finishes at the 2015 and 2016 Meridian Regionals and the 2017 Central Regionals. She was featured in 2017 documentary 'Fittest on Earth: A Decade of Fitness'. She competed at the 2015 World Weightlifting Championships in the 75 kg category.

CrossFit Games results

Weightlifting Major results

References

1992 births
Living people
Sara Sigmundsdottir
CrossFit athletes
Sara Sigmundsdottir
Place of birth missing (living people)